This is a list of vice presidents in 2020.

Africa
  Vice President - Bornito de Sousa (2017–present)
  Vice President – Slumber Tsogwane (2018–present)
  -
1 Vice Presidents
 First Vice President – Gaston Sindimwo (2015–2020)
 Second Vice President - Joseph Butore (2015–2020)
2 Vice President - Prosper Bazombanza (2020–present)
 Vice President -  vacant (2019–present)
 Vice President -  Teodoro Nguema Obiang Mangue (2016–present)
 Vice President -  vacant (2019–present)
  Vice President - Isatou Touray (2019–present)
  Vice President  - Mahamudu Bawumia (2017–present)
  Vice President - Daniel Kablan Duncan (2017–2020)
  Deputy President - William Ruto (2012–present)
  Vice President - Jewel Taylor (2018–present)
Libya
  Government of National Accord of Libya  (Interim government internationally recognized as the sole legitimate government of Libya from 12 March 2016) - Vice Presidents of the Presidential Council of Libya (Tripoli) - Abdulsalam Kajman (2016–2021), Ahmed Maiteeq (2016–2021)
 'Government of House of Representatives of Libya' (Government of Libya internationally recognized to 12 March 2016) Deputy presidents of the House of Representatives of Libya -  Imhemed Shaib (2014–2021).  Ahmed Huma (2014–2021)
  Vice President  -
Everton Chimulirenji (de facto) (2019–2020)
Saulos Chilima (2020–present)
 
Vice President - Malick Diaw  (2020)
Vice President - Assimi Goïta  (2020–2021)
  Vice President –Eddy Boissezon (2019–present)
  Vice President -Nangolo Mbumba (2018–present)
  Vice President - Yemi Osinbajo (2015–present)
  Vice President -
Vincent Meriton (2016–2020)
Ahmed Afif (2020–present)
  Vice President -Mohamed Juldeh Jalloh (2018–present)
  Vice President - Abdirahman Saylici (2010–present)
  Deputy President -David Mabuza (2018–present)
 
First Vice President -
Taban Deng Gai (2016–2020)
Riek Machar (2020–present)
Vice President - James Wani Igga (2016–2020)
Second Vice President - James Wani Igga (2020–present)
Third Vice President - Taban Deng Gai (2020–present)
Fourth Vice President - Rebecca Nyandeng Garang (2020–present)
Fifth Vice President - Hussein Abdelbagi (2020–present)
  Deputy Chairman of the Sovereignty Council – Mohamed Hamdan Dagalo (2019–present)
  Vice President - Samia Suluhu (2015–2021)
 
First Vice President – Seif Sharif Hamad (2020–2021)
Second Vice President –
Seif Ali Iddi (2010–2020)
Hemed Suleiman Abdalla (2020–present)
  Vice President - Edward Ssekandi (2011–2021)
  Vice President - Inonge Wina (2015–2021)
 
First Vice Presidents –  Constantino Chiwenga (2017–present)
Second Vice President – Kembo Mohadi (2017–2021)

Asia
  Vice President -
Aslan Bartsits (2019–2020)
Badr Gunba (2020–present)
 
First Vice President -
Abdul Rashid Dostum (2014–2020)
Amrullah Saleh (2020–2021)
Second Vice President - Sarwar Danish (2014–2021)
  Vice President - Mehriban Aliyeva (2017–present)
  Vice President - Wang Qishan (2018–present) 
  Vice President - Venkaiah Naidu (2017–present)
  Vice President - Ma'ruf Amin (2019–present)
 
First Vice President - Eshaq Jahangiri (2013–2021)
Others Vice Presidents -  Mohammad Nahavandian (Vice President for Economic Affairs)  (2017–2021), Mohammad Bagher Nobakht  (Vice President and Head of Management and Planning Organization) (2016–2021), Laya Joneidi (Vice President for Legal Affairs) (2017–2021), Hossein-Ali Amiri (Vice President for Parliamentary Affairs) (2017–2021), Sorena Sattari (Vice President for Science and Technology Affaires) (2013–present),  Masoumeh Ebtekar (Vice President for Women's and Family Affairs) (2017–2021), Ali Akbar Salehi (Vice President and Head of Atomic Energy Organization) (2013–2021), Mohammad-Ali Shahidi (Vice President and Head of Martyrs and Veterans Affairs Foundation) (2016–2020). Saeed Ohadi (Vice President and Head of Martyrs and Veterans Affairs Foundation) (2020–2021), Jamshid Ansari (Vice President and Head of Administrative and Recruitment Organization) (2016–2021), Isa Kalantari (Vice President and Head of Environmental Protection Organization) (2017–2021)
  Vice Presidents - vacant (2018–present)
 
 First Vice President - Mustafa Said Qadir (2019–present)
 Second Vice President - Jaafar Sheikh Mustafa (2019–present)
 
Vice presidents de facto - Vice Chairmen of State Affairs Commission - Choe Ryong-hae (first vice-chairmen - 2019–present), Pak Pong-ju (2016–2021)
Vice presidents de jure - Vice Chairmen of the Presidium of Supreme People's Assembly - Pak Yong-il (2019–present), Thae Hyong-chol (2019–2021)
  Vice President – Phankham Viphavanh (2016–2021)
  Vice President –Faisal Naseem (2018–present)
 
First Vice President – Myint Swe (2016–2021)
Second Vice President – Henry Van Thio (2016–present)
  Vice President - Nanda Bahadur Pun (2015–present)
  Vice President – Leni Robredo (2016–present)
Syria
  
Vice President – Najah al-Attar ((2006–present))
Vice President – Ali Mamlouk (2019–2021)

First Vice President – Okab Yahya, (2019–2021)
Second Vice President – Abdel Hakim Bashar (2019–present)
Third Vice President – 
Dima Moussa (2018–2020)
Ruba Habboush (2020–present)
 Vice President –
Chen Chien-jen (2016–2020)
Lai Ching-te (2020–present)
 Vice President – Fuat Oktay (2018–present)
 Vice President – Sheikh Mohammed bin Rashid Al Maktoum (2006–present)
 Vice President – Đặng Thị Ngọc Thịnh (2016–2021)
Yemen
 Vice President – Ali Mohsen al-Ahmar (2016–present)

Europe
  Vice President - Iliana Iotova  (2017–present)
  Vice President - vacant (1974–present)
  Vice President - Guy Parmelin (2020)

North America and the Caribbean
 
First Vice President - Epsy Campbell Barr (2018–present)
Second Vice President - Marvin Rodríguez Cordero (2018–present)
  Vice President of Cuba - Salvador Valdés Mesa (2019–present)
  Vice President -
Margarita Cedeño de Fernández (2012–2020)
Raquel Peña de Antuña (2020–present)
  Vice President – Félix Ulloa (2019–present)
  Vice President –
Jafeth Cabrera (2016–2020)
Guillermo Castillo (2020–present)
 
First Vice President - Ricardo Antonio Alvarez Arias (2014–2022)
Second Vice President - Olga Margarita Alvarado Rodríguez (2018–2022)
Third Vice President - María Antonia Rivera Rosales (2018–2022)
  Vice President - Rosario Murillo (2017–present)
  Vice President - Jose Gabriel Carrizo (2019–present)
  Vice President - Mike Pence (2017–2021)

Oceania
  Vice President – Teuea Toatu (2019-prezent)
  Vice President - Yosiwo P. George (2015–present)
  Vice President - Raynold Oilouch - (2017–present)
  
Member of Council of Deputies –  vacant (2017–present)
Member of Council of Deputies –  vacant (2018–present)
Member of Council of Deputies –  Le Mamea Ropati (2016–present)

South America
  Vice President - Cristina Fernández de Kirchner (2019–present)
  Vice President - David Choquehuanca (2020–present)
  Vice President – Hamilton Mourão (2019–present)
  Vice President - Marta Lucía Ramírez (2018–present)
  Vice President -
Otto Sonnenholzner (2018–2020)
María Alejandra Muñoz (2020–2021)
 
First Vice President -
Moses Nagamootoo (2015–2020)
Mark Phillips (2020–present)
Second Vice President - Khemraj Ramjattan (2015–2020)
Third Vice President - vacant (2019–2020t)
Fourth Vice President - Sydney Allicock (2015–2020)
Vice President - Bharrat Jagdeo (2020–present)
  Vice President - Hugo Velázquez Moreno (2018–present)
 
First  Vice President - 
 Mercedes Aráoz (2018–2020)
 vacant (2020–present)
Second Vice President - vacant (2018–present)
  Vice President -
Ashwin Adhin (2015–2020)
Ronnie Brunswijk (2020–present)
  Vice President - 
Lucía Topolansky (2017–2020)
Beatriz Argimón (2020–present)
  Vice President - Delcy Rodríguez (2018–present)

See also
List of current vice presidents and designated acting presidents

References

External links
CIA

Lists of vice presidents